Kolbäcks VK is a volleyball club in Kolbäck, Sweden, established in 1948.

The club won the Swedish men's national volleyball championship in 1962, 1963 and 1965, and the Swedish women's national volleyball championship in 1969. The club also won the Swedish men's junior national volleyball championship in 1974 and the Swedish women's junior national volleyball championship in 1985 and 2003.

References

External links
official website

1948 establishments in Sweden
Sport in Västmanland County
Volleyball clubs established in 1948
Swedish volleyball clubs